Sundacossus gauguini is a moth in the family Cossidae. It is found on Sumba.

References

Natural History Museum Lepidoptera generic names catalog

Cossinae